Dr. Luis Esteban Palacios W. of Venezuela served as the Chairman of the Inter-American Scout Committee.

In 1974, he was awarded the 89th Bronze Wolf, the only distinction of the World Organization of the Scout Movement, awarded by the World Scout Committee for exceptional services to world Scouting. He was also a recipient of the Silver World Award.

References

External links

 

Recipients of the Bronze Wolf Award
Year of birth missing
Scouting and Guiding in Venezuela
Possibly living people